USS Conqueror (AMc-70) was an Accentor-class coastal minesweeper acquired by the U.S. Navy for the dangerous task of removing mines from minefields laid in the water to prevent ships from passing.

Conqueror was built by Warren Fish Company, Pensacola, Florida,

World War II service 

Conqueror was placed in service on 6 March 1942, and assigned successively to the 6th Naval District, the Caribbean Sea Frontier, and the 10th Naval District.
Home Port in 1944-1945 was US Submarine base at St. Thomas V.I.

Placed out of service 

On 6 December 1945 she was placed out of service and delivered to the War Shipping Administration for disposal.

References

External links 
 

 

Accentor-class minesweepers
World War II mine warfare vessels of the United States
Ships built in Florida
1941 ships